Seb Tape (born 6 August 1992) is a former professional Australian rules footballer who played for the Gold Coast Football Club in the Australian Football League (AFL). He was drafted by with pick 13 in the 2010 national draft. He made his debut in Gold Coast's first game, playing against Carlton in round 2 of 2011 season. Tape is a member of the Gold Coast Sun's Inaugural Squad, starting the game in the back pocket. In this game he collected 11 disposals (9 kicks and 2 handballs), also accumulating 8 marks and 3 tackles. 
Tape attended Westminster School in Adelaide, where he was School Captain.

AFL career 
Tape debuted in round 2 of the 2011 season against Carlton. The Gold Coast Suns Inaugural match ended in a large defeat to the Suns who showed glimpses of their big potential. Tape started in the Back Pocket and was praised by coach Guy McKenna post game for his pleasing performance, particularly his freakish mark in the third quarter.

Tape finished the 2011 season playing 13 games. He often featured amongst the most consistent players and has earned the title of most courageous within the side due to his attack and commitment to the ball. Tape returned to begin the 2012 season and is shaping up to be a truly promising and talented defender who will solidify his place within the Gold Coast defence.

In Round 1 of the 2012 AFL season, Tape lost his three front teeth in a collision with Crows forward Jason Porplyzia during the second quarter. Tape continued to play without his teeth until half time, where he was subbed off.

In Round 12 of the 2012 season, Tape was involved in a collision with North Melbourne forward Lindsay Thomas. Thomas dived on the ball, colliding with Tape's leg and twisting his knee to the side. Tape's anterior cruciate ligament (ACL) was torn in the incident and he required a full knee reconstruction, forcing him out of the remainder of the 2012 season as well as the 2013 pre season.

On 13 July 2013 Tape made his long-awaited return to the Sun's senior side coming up against Richmond. Tape had a stellar return amassing 8 disposals, 4 marks and 6 tackles. Although Gold Coast went down by 11 points, Tapes return to the back lines gave the team stability in defence.

Never able to secure a regular game in the side, Tape was delisted at the conclusion of the 2016 season. He remained in south-eastern Queensland and joined the Southport Australian Football Club in the North East Australian Football League as co-captain from 2017, and he remains with the club (now competing in the Victorian Football League) as of 2021. He was co-captain of the side's 2018 NEAFL premiership victory.

Statistics

|- style="background-color: #EAEAEA"
! scope="row" style="text-align:center" | 2011
|
| 48 || 13 || 0 || 0 || 58 || 85 || 143 || 41 || 39 || 0.0 || 0.0 || 4.5 || 6.5 || 11.0 || 3.2 || 3.0
|-
! scope="row" style="text-align:center" | 2012
|
| 48 || 10 || 0 || 0 || 46 || 59 || 105 || 29 || 22 || 0.0 || 0.0 || 4.6 || 5.9 || 10.5 || 2.9 || 2.2
|- style="background-color: #EAEAEA"
! scope="row" style="text-align:center" | 2013
|
| 48 || 7 || 1 || 0 || 28 || 39 || 67 || 17 || 27 || 0.1 || 0.0 || 4.0 || 5.6 || 9.6 || 2.4 || 3.9
|-
! scope="row" style="text-align:center" | 2014
|
| 48 || 3 || 0 || 0 || 10 || 11 || 21 || 2 || 9 || 0.0 || 0.0 || 3.3 || 3.7 || 7.0 || 0.7 || 3.0
|- style="background:#eaeaea;"
! scope="row" style="text-align:center" | 2015
|
| 48 || 4 || 0 || 0 || 24 || 21 || 45 || 10 || 12 || 0.0 || 0.0 || 6.0 || 5.3 || 11.3 || 2.5 || 3.0
|-
! scope="row" style="text-align:center" | 2016
|
| 48 || 3 || 0 || 0 || 12 || 29 || 41 || 7 || 15 || 0.0 || 0.0 || 4.0 || 9.7 || 13.7 || 2.3 || 5.0
|- class="sortbottom"
! colspan=3| Career
! 40
! 1
! 0
! 178
! 244
! 422
! 106
! 124
! 0.0
! 0.0
! 4.5
! 6.1
! 10.6
! 2.7
! 3.1
|}

References

External links

1992 births
Living people
Gold Coast Football Club players
People educated at Westminster School, Adelaide
Australian rules footballers from South Australia
Glenelg Football Club players
Southport Australian Football Club players